Mace is a surname, and may refer to:

 Arthur Cruttenden Mace (1874–1928), British Egyptologist
 Borden Mace (1920–2014), American film producer 
 Cecil Alec Mace (1894–1971), British philosopher and industrial psychologist
 Daniel Mace (politician) (1811–1867), U.S. Representative from Indiana
 Daniel Mace (biblical scholar), English textual critic of the New Testament
 Eduardo Mace (born 1966), Anglo-Brazilian businessman, pioneer of multimedia software
 Flora Mace (born 1949), American glass artist
 Frances Laughton Mace (1836–1899), American poet
 Fred Mace (1878–1917), American silent era actor
  Fred Mace (1895–1938), English professional footballer
 Dame Georgina Mace (1953–2020), British ecologist and conservation scientist 
 James Mace (1952–2004), American historian
 Jem Mace (1831–1910), English bare-knuckle boxing champion
 Joe Mace (born 1971), British television producer and presenter
 Myles Mace (1911–2000), Harvard Business School professor
 Nancy Mace (born 1977), U.S. Representative from South Carolina
 Zoe Mace, English singer

See also 
 Macé (surname)

French-language surnames